Anat Cohen-Dayag is an Israeli businesswoman. She is president and chief executive officer of the Israeli biotechnology firm Compugen Ltd, a company involved in drug discovery. She previously worked as a scientist at the R&D department of Orgenics.

Education
She holds a B.Sc. in Biology from the Ben-Gurion University, and has obtained an MSc in  Chemical Immunology and a PhD in Biological Chemistry from the Weizmann Institute of Science.

References

Israeli chief executives
Living people
21st-century Israeli businesswomen
21st-century Israeli businesspeople
Ben-Gurion University of the Negev alumni
Weizmann Institute of Science alumni
Israeli women scientists
Israeli biologists
Israeli women chemists
Year of birth missing (living people)
Place of birth missing (living people)
Israeli biochemists
Israeli geneticists